The following events occurred in July 1937:

July 1, 1937 (Thursday)
The Biscay Campaign ended in Nationalist victory.
Roman Catholic bishops in Spain issued a joint letter pledging their support for the Nationalists.
The Irish general election was held. Fianna Fáil again fell just short of a majority, winning exactly half of the 138 seats in the Dáil Éireann.
A constitutional referendum was held in Ireland in tandem with the general election; 56% of voters approved the new constitution. 
German authorities arrested Martin Niemöller.
The MacGregor Arctic Expedition began.

July 2, 1937 (Friday)
Amelia Earhart and navigator Fred Noonan disappeared somewhere over the Pacific Ocean during an attempt to fly around the world.
The Holditch Colliery disaster killed 30 men in Chesterton, Staffordshire, England.
Don Budge of the United States defeated Gottfried von Cramm of Germany in the gentlemen's singles final at Wimbledon.
Born: Richard Petty, race car driver, in Level Cross, North Carolina

July 3, 1937 (Saturday)
Dorothy Round Little of the United Kingdom defeated Jadwiga Jędrzejowska of Poland in the ladies' singles final at Wimbledon.
The Marine Parkway Bridge (now the Marine Parkway–Gil Hodges Memorial Bridge) opened in Brooklyn, New York.
Died: May Sybil Leslie, 59, English chemist

July 4, 1937 (Sunday)
7,000 of Sir Oswald Mosley's Blackshirts marching from Kentish Town to Trafalgar Square clashed with anti-fascists who tried to push past the 2,383 police on hand, but order was generally maintained amid 27 arrests.
Born: Queen Sonja of Norway, in Oslo

July 5, 1937 (Monday)
The Battle of Albarracín began.
Hormel Foods Corporation began selling the canned meat product Spam.
Born: Wolf von Lojewski, journalist, in Berlin, Germany; Jo de Roo, cyclist, in Schore, Netherlands

July 6, 1937 (Tuesday)
The Battle of Brunete began.
Born: Vladimir Ashkenazy, pianist and conductor, in Gorky, USSR; Ned Beatty, actor, in Louisville, Kentucky (d. 2021); Michael Sata, 5th President of Zambia, in Mpika, Northern Rhodesia (d. 2014)
Died: Carlos Eugenio Restrepo, 69, 7th President of Colombia

July 7, 1937 (Wednesday)
The Marco Polo Bridge Incident occurred in China, marking the beginning of the Second Sino-Japanese War.
The Peel Commission published a report on the situation in Mandatory Palestine, recommending an end to the British mandate and that the territory be partitioned into an Arab state and a Jewish state.
The American League defeated the National League 8–3 in the 5th Major League Baseball All-Star Game at Griffith Stadium in Washington, D.C..
Born: Nanami Shiono, author and novelist, in Tokyo, Japan; Tung Chee-hwa, Chief Executive of Hong Kong, in Shanghai, China

July 8, 1937 (Thursday)
Turkey, Iran, Iraq and Afghanistan signed the Treaty of Saadabad.
The Teatro Gran Rex opened in Buenos Aires, Argentina.

July 9, 1937 (Friday)
The Fox vault fire occurred in a film storage facility in Little Ferry, New Jersey, destroying most of the silent films produced by Fox Film Corporation before 1932.
The Republicans took Quijorna.
Hotel and café workers in Paris went on strike for a 5-day work week.
Henry Cotton won the Open Championship.
Born: David Hockney, artist, in Bradford, England
Died: Oliver Law, 36, African-American communist and labor organizer (killed in the Spanish Civil War)

July 10, 1937 (Saturday)
Chiang Kai-shek made a radio address to millions announcing the Kuomintang's policy of resistance against Japan.
24 people were executed in Siberia for sabotaging Soviet railways.

July 11, 1937 (Sunday)
Rudolf Hasse of Germany won the Belgian Grand Prix.
Died: George Gershwin, 38, American composer and pianist (brain tumor)

July 12, 1937 (Monday)
The Spanish pavilion opened at the Exposition Internationale des Arts et Techniques dans la Vie Moderne in Paris, featuring Pablo Picasso's mural-sized painting Guernica hanging in the entrance hall.  
American mercenary pilot Harold Edward Dahl was shot down near Madrid and captured by Nationalist forces.
The comic strip Abbie an' Slats first appeared.
Born: Bill Cosby, actor, and comedian, in Philadelphia, Pennsylvania; Lionel Jospin, Prime Minister of France, in Meudon, France

July 13, 1937 (Tuesday)
Germán Busch became President of Bolivia for the second time.
Died: Victor Laloux, 86, French architect

July 14, 1937 (Wednesday)
Mikhail Gromov and two other Soviet airmen completed a 6,306 mile flight from Moscow to San Jacinto, California in a Tupolev ANT-25, a new distance record.
Born: Yoshirō Mori, Prime Minister of Japan, in Nomi, Ishikawa, Japan
Died: Julius Meier, 62, American businessman, civic leader and politician; Joseph Taylor Robinson, 64, American politician

July 15, 1937 (Thursday)
Buchenwald concentration camp opened.
The German-Polish accord on Upper Silesia signed May 15, 1922 expired. Germany was no longer obligated to provide equality to all citizens in this region and so the Nuremberg Laws immediately went into effect there.

July 16, 1937 (Friday)
Adolf Hitler opened a major art festival in Munich. He made a preview visit to the Degenerate Art Exhibition where a well-known photograph was taken of him passing the Dada wall along with several other Nazi officials.

July 17, 1937 (Saturday)
A train derailment in the township of Bihta in Bihar, British India killed 107 people.

July 18, 1937 (Sunday)
On the first anniversary of the outbreak of the Spanish Civil War, both Francisco Franco and Manuel Azaña made addresses to the country.
The Haus der Kunst opened in Munich, Germany.
Born: Roald Hoffmann, theoretical chemist and Nobel laureate, in Złoczów, Poland; Hunter S. Thompson, journalist and author, in Louisville, Kentucky (d. 2005)
Died: Julian Bell, 29, English poet (killed in the Spanish Civil War)

July 19, 1937 (Monday)
The Degenerate Art Exhibition opened in Munich.
Generalissimo Francisco Franco indicated that the Spanish monarchy may be restored in the event of a Nationalist victory.
Born: George Hamilton IV, country musician, in Winston-Salem, North Carolina (d. 2014)

July 20, 1937 (Tuesday)
Player-manager Rogers Hornsby of the St. Louis Browns played in his final major league game, going 0-for-1 in a pinch hitting appearance during a 5–4 loss to the New York Yankees.
Born: Dick Hafer, comics artist, in Reading, Pennsylvania (d. 2003); Ken Ogata, actor, in Tokyo, Japan (d. 2008)
Died: Guglielmo Marconi, 63, Italian inventor and electrical engineer

July 21, 1937 (Wednesday)
Éamon de Valera was re-elected President of the Executive Council of the Irish Free State.
The musical film High, Wide and Handsome starring Irene Dunne and Randolph Scott premiered at the Astor Theatre in New York City.

July 22, 1937 (Thursday)
President Roosevelt's Judicial Procedures Reform Bill was defeated 70–20 in the Senate and sent back to committee.
The biographical film The Toast of New York starring Edward Arnold, Cary Grant, Frances Farmer, and Jack Oakie premiered at Radio City Music Hall in New York City.

July 23, 1937 (Friday)
British Parliament passed the Matrimonial Causes Act, liberalizing the country's divorce laws.
The seven-part radio series Les Misérables adapted by Orson Welles began airing on the Mutual Network.

July 24, 1937 (Saturday)
In Alabama, four of the nine Scottsboro Boys were set free after six years of legal battles.
Born: Quinlan Terry, architect, in Hampstead, London, England

July 25, 1937 (Sunday)
The Battle of Brunete ended inconclusively.
Roger Lapébie of France won the Tour de France.
Rudolf Caracciola of Germany won the German Grand Prix.

July 26, 1937 (Monday)
El Salvador quit the League of Nations.
The Langfang Incident and Guanganmen Incident occurred in China.
The Orizaba earthquake occurred in eastern Mexico, killing at least 34 people.
Died: Carl Minkley, 70, American socialist politician

July 27, 1937 (Tuesday)
The sale of the British newspaper The Morning Post to the rival Daily Telegraph was announced. The Post was discontinued after 165 years in print and absorbed into the Telegraph.
Born: Anna Dawson, actress and singer, in Bolton, England; Don Galloway, actor, in Brooksville, Kentucky (d. 2009)

July 28, 1937 (Wednesday)
The infamous defrocked English priest Harold Davidson was mauled by a lion at the Skegness Amusement Park. He died two days later. 
Northern Ireland was struck by a wave of bombings in reaction to the one-day visit of the King and Queen of England.

July 29, 1937 (Thursday)
25 were killed in a train derailment south of Paris.
The Tungchow mutiny occurred within the East Hopei Army.
Japanese forces bombed Tientsin, destroying Nankai University.
Born: Ryutaro Hashimoto, Prime Minister of Japan, in Sōja, Japan (d. 2006); Daniel McFadden, econometrician and Nobel laureate, in Raleigh, North Carolina

July 30, 1937 (Friday)
Japanese forces occupied Tientsin.
L. Ron Hubbard's first published novel Buckskin Brigades was released.
Died: Harold Davidson, 62, defrocked Church of England priest (mauled by lion); Hans von Rosenberg, 62, German diplomat and politician

July 31, 1937 (Saturday)
Belfast was shaken by a land mine explosion in the West End, 50 yards from a police barracks.

References

1937
1937-04
1937-07